Light rail in the United States is a mode of rail-based transport, usually urban in nature. When compared to heavy rail systems like commuter rail or rapid transit (subway), light rail systems are typically designed to carry fewer passengers and are capable of operating in mixed traffic (street running) or on routes that are not entirely grade-separated. Systems typically take one of four forms: the "first-generation" legacy systems, the "second-generation" modern light rail systems, streetcars, and hybrid rail systems (light rail with some commuter rail features). All of the systems use similar technologies, and some systems blur the lines between the different forms.

The United States, with its 27 systems (as counted by the Light Rail Transit Association), has a much larger number of "true" light rail systems (not including streetcar systems), by far, compared to any other country in the world (the next largest are Germany with 10 and Japan with 9).

According to the American Public Transportation Association, of the roughly 30 cities with light rail systems in the United States, the light rail systems in six of them (Boston, Los Angeles, Philadelphia, Portland (Oregon), San Diego, and San Francisco) achieve more than 30 million unlinked passenger transits per year.

History 

From the mid-19th century onwards, horse-drawn trams (or horsecars) were used in cities around the world. The St. Charles Avenue Line of New Orleans' streetcar system is the oldest continuously operating street railway system in the world, beginning operation as a horse-drawn system in 1835.

From the late 1880s onwards, electrically powered street railways became technically feasible following the invention of a trolley pole system of collecting current by American inventor Frank J. Sprague who installed the first successful electrified trolley system in Richmond, Virginia in 1888. They became popular because roads were then poorly surfaced, and before the invention of the internal combustion engine and the advent of motor-buses, they were the only practical means of public transport around cities.

The streetcar systems constructed in the 19th and early 20th centuries typically only ran in single-car setups. Some rail lines experimented with multiple unit configurations, where streetcars were joined together to make short trains, but this did not become common until later. When lines were built over longer distances (typically with a single track) before good roads were common, they were generally called interurban streetcars or radial railways in North America.

Historically, the rail gauge has had considerable variations, with a variety of gauges common in many early systems (e.g. the broad Pennsylvania trolley gauge, etc. used by New Orleans' streetcars and by the light rail systems in Philadelphia and Pittsburgh). However, most modern second-generation light rail systems now operate on standard gauge rail.

After World War II, six major cities in the United States (Boston, Newark, New Orleans, Philadelphia, Pittsburgh, San Francisco) continued to operate large first-generation streetcar systems, although most of them were later converted to modern light rail standards. Toronto in Canada marks the other city in North America with a continuing first-generation streetcar system. Additionally, a seventh American city, Cleveland, maintained an interurban system (e.g. the Blue and Green Lines) equivalent to what is now "light rail", that opened before World War I, and which is still in operation to this day.

When several of these cities upgraded to new technology (e.g. San Francisco, Newark, and Pittsburgh), they called it "light rail" to differentiate it from their existing streetcar systems since some continued to operate portions of both the old and new systems.

In the United States, most of the original first-generation streetcar systems were decommissioned from the 1950s onward through approximately 1970 as the popularity of the automobile increased.

Although a few traditional streetcar or trolley systems still exist to this day  the term "light rail" has come to mean a different type of rail system. Modern light rail technology has primarily German origins, since an attempt by Boeing Vertol to introduce a new American light rail vehicle was a technical failure. After World War II, the Germans retained their streetcar (Straßenbahn) networks and evolved them into model light rail systems (Stadtbahn).

The renaissance of light rail in the United States began in 1981, when the first truly second-generation light rail system was inaugurated in the United States, the San Diego Trolley in California, which adopted use of the German Siemens-Duewag U2 light rail vehicle. (This was just three years after the first North American second-generation light rail system opened in the Canadian city of Edmonton, Alberta in 1978, and which used the same German Siemens-Duewag U2 vehicles as San Diego). Other North American cities, particularly on the West Coast, began planning their own light rail systems in the 1980s.

, there are a total of 53 operational light rail-type lines and systems (noting that some cities, such as Philadelphia, Portland, San Francisco and Seattle, have more than one light rail system) that offer regular year-round transit service in the United States: 26 modern light rail systems, 14 modern streetcar systems, and 13 heritage streetcar systems (including the San Francisco cable car system).

"First-generation" legacy systems 

The first-generation legacy systems are typically vestigial elements of sprawling streetcar systems that were decommissioned from the 1950s onward through approximately 1970 as the popularity of the automobile increased. These systems were spared that fate due to these systems having high ridership and typically some form of exclusive right of way. 

Many of these streetcar systems have been at least partly upgraded to more closely resemble the more modern second-generation light rail systems, while some continue to operate with few changes

"Second-generation" modern systems 

The second-generation of modern light rail systems began in 1981 with the San Diego Trolley, which ushered in several systems that generally feature large multi-car trains that travel larger distances, and make fewer stops, on exclusive rights-of-way. These systems were inspired by the German Stadtbahn (English: city rail) systems.

Streetcar systems 

The modern streetcar era started in 2001 with the Portland Streetcar, which inspired several other systems that generally feature smaller single-car trains that travel on short routes, with frequent stops, in lanes that are shared with automobile traffic (street running). There are also some heritage streetcar lines, which operate in the same manner using vintage vehicles or historic vehicle replicas, which have been built before and after the modern streetcar movement.

"Hybrid rail" systems  

Hybrid rail systems, light rail with some features similar to commuter rail, were introduced in 2004 with New Jersey's River Line. Hybrid rail systems operate small multiple unit railcars like a light rail system, but like commuter rail, they are typically powered by diesel engines over tracks which may be shared with freight trains (which typically only operate overnight, when passenger service has stopped). Unlike most commuter rail systems which only operate during the weekday peak travel periods, hybrid rail systems operate all-day, every day, but typically at longer headways than light rail.

Systems under construction 

The following table lists entirely new light rail, streetcar, or hybrid rail systems under construction. Systems that are in the planning stages but not yet under construction (e.g. Glassboro–Camden Line, MARTA Clifton Corridor, Austin Capital MetroRail Blue and Orange Lines, and Omaha Streetcar), are not listed; expansions of existing systems are also not listed here.

See also 

 List of United States light rail systems by ridership
 List of rail transit systems in the United States
 Light rail in North America
 Streetcars in North America
 Public Transportation in San Diego
 Light rail in New Jersey
 Transportation in Dallas, Texas
 Transportation in Houston
 Transportation in Portland, Oregon
 Transportation in San Francisco
 Transportation in Salt Lake City
 Transportation of St. Louis, Missouri
 Rail transit in metropolitan Denver
 Rail transit in Boston
 Transportation in San Jose, California
 Transportation in Hudson Country, New Jersey
 Rail transit in Kenosha, Wisconsin
 Transportation in New York City

Notes

References

External links 

 American Public Transit Association (APTA)
 Table of Light Rail Transit Agencies in the United States (from APTA)
 Federal Transit Administration (U.S.)
 Transportation Research Board (TRB) of the U.S. National Research Council
 Commuter Rail, Light Rail & Rail Transit News
 Light Rail Central photos & news
 A movie of Armour's electric trolley, circa 1897 from Library of Congress